Manuel Perez may refer to:

Arts and entertainment
 Manuel Perez (musician) (1871–1946), American cornetist and bandleader
 Manuel Perez (animator) (1914–1981), animator for Warner Bros. Cartoons
 Manuel Pérez (director) (born 1939), Cuban film director
 Manuel "Manny" Pérez Batista or Manny Pérez (born 1969), Dominican actor

Politics
 V. Manuel Perez (born 1973), California State Assemblyman, 80th District 
 Manuel Pérez (President of Nicaragua) (died 1852), President of Nicaragua 1843–1844
 Manuel Pérez (1735-1819), Lieutenant Governor of Upper Louisiana 1787-1792

Sports
 Manuel Pérez Flores (born 1980), Mexican football player with CF Monterrey
 Manuel Perez (footballer) (born 1991), French professional footballer 
 Manuel Pérez (boxer) (born 1984), Mexican-American professional boxer in the Lightweight division
 Manuel Pérez Brunicardi (born 1978), Spanish ski mountaineer
Manny Perez (soccer) (born 1999), American soccer player
  Manuel Perez Benitez better known as El Cordobés, Spanish matador of the 1960s
 Manuel Pérez Luna (born 1966), Spanish wheelchair basketball player

Other
Manuel Pérez García (born 1979), Spanish academic
 Manuel Pérez Jr. (1923–1945), American soldier and Medal of Honor recipient
 Manuel Pérez (teacher) (1890–1951), Puerto Rican teacher and public servant
 Manuel Pérez (guerrilla leader) (died 1988), leader of the Colombian National Liberation Army from the 1970s to 1998